Igor Arkhipov (born November 17, 1953 in Saratov) is a Russian politician and member of the State Duma of the Russian Federation.

See also
Politics of Russia

References

Fifth convocation members of the State Duma (Russian Federation)
Living people
1953 births
Politicians from Saratov